The 1933–34 İstanbul Football League season was the 26th season of the league. Beşiktaş JK won the league for the second time.

Season

References

Istanbul Football League seasons
Turkey
Istanbul